The Northumberland Historic District is a historic district listed in the US government's National Register of Historic Places in 1988.  The "gem" of the district is a National Historic Landmark, the Joseph Priestley House.  It includes one other separately Registered Historic Place, the Dr. Joseph Priestley House, also known as the "Priestley-Forsyth Memorial Library".  It is bordered roughly by 4th Street, A Street, N. Shore Railroad, and Wheatley Avenue in Northumberland, Pennsylvania.

In 1988 there were more than 100 contributing structures and 73 non-contributing structures in the district.

Photos
Seven photos are available: Photo 1, Photo 2, Photo 3, Photo 4, 
Photo 5, Photo 6, and Photo 7.

References

Historic districts on the National Register of Historic Places in Pennsylvania
Queen Anne architecture in Pennsylvania
Italianate architecture in Pennsylvania
Geography of Northumberland County, Pennsylvania
Tourist attractions in Northumberland County, Pennsylvania
National Register of Historic Places in Northumberland County, Pennsylvania